That's How They Do It in Dixie: The Essential Collection is a greatest hits album by  American musician Hank Williams Jr. This album was released on June 27, 2006 on the Curb Records label. This album has two brand new songs, "That's How They Do It in Dixie," and "Stirrin' It Up". The former was released as a single, while "A Country Boy Can Survive" was re-released. Both songs were made into music videos in 2006. The album debuted at No. 3 on the Billboard Country Albums chart and has been certified Gold by the RIAA, giving him the 23rd Gold album of his career.

Track listing
All songs written by Hank Williams Jr., except where noted.
 "That's How They Do It in Dixie" (Chris Tompkins, Josh Kear, Mark Irwin) – 3:16
feat. Big & Rich, Gretchen Wilson and Van Zant
 "Family Tradition" – 4:02
 "All My Rowdy Friends Are Coming Over Tonight" – 2:58
 "A Country Boy Can Survive" – 4:17
 "Whiskey Bent and Hell Bound" – 3:10
 "There's a Tear in My Beer" – 2:52
feat. Hank Williams
 "If Heaven Ain't a Lot Like Dixie" (Bill Maddox) – 2:47
 "Born to Boogie" – 2:43
 "Women I've Never Had" – 2:51
 "Country State of Mind" (Hank Williams Jr., Roger Alan Wade) – 3:58
 "My Name Is Bocephus" – 4:42
 "Stirrin' It Up" – 3:25

Personnel on new tracks
 Tim Akers – Hammond organ
 Big & Rich – vocals on "That's How They Do It in Dixie"
 Bruce Bouton – steel guitar
 Pat Buchanan – electric guitar
 Joe Chemay – bass guitar
 Wes Hightower – background vocals
 John Barlow Jarvis – piano
 Paul Leim – drums
 Chris Leuzinger – electric guitar
 Brent Rowan – electric guitar
 Bryan Sutton – acoustic guitar
 Van Zant – vocals on "That's How They Do It in Dixie"
 Hank Williams Jr. – lead vocals
 Gretchen Wilson – vocals on "That's How They Do It in Dixie"

Charts

Weekly charts

Year-end charts

References

2006 compilation albums
Hank Williams Jr. compilation albums
Albums produced by Barry Beckett
Albums produced by Jimmy Bowen
Albums produced by Doug Johnson (record producer)
Albums produced by Jim Ed Norman
Asylum-Curb Records compilation albums